The siege of St. Augustine was a military engagement that took place during June–July 1740. It involved a British attack on the city of St Augustine in Spanish Florida and was a part of the much larger conflict known as the War of Jenkins' Ear.

Background
In September 1739, King George II sent orders to Governor James Oglethorpe of the colony of Georgia "to annoy the Subjects of Spain in the best manner" possible. To pursue these orders, Oglethorpe encouraged his Creek allies to begin attacking Spaniards and Florida Indians. On November 13, a group of Spaniards landed on Amelia Island and killed two British soldiers. In response, Oglethorpe began a punitive campaign with a mixed force of British regulars (the 42nd Regiment of Foot), colonial militia from the Province of Georgia and the Carolinas, and Native American Creek, Chickasaw, and Uchees. The campaign began in December 1739, and by January Oglethorpe was raiding Spanish forts west of St. Augustine. In May 1740, Oglethorpe undertook an expedition to capture St. Augustine itself. In support of that objective, Oglethorpe first captured Fort San Diego, Fort Picolotta, Fort San Francisco de Pupo, and Fort Mose, the first free black settlement in America.

Siege
Oglethorpe deployed his batteries on the island of Santa Anastasia while a British naval squadron blockaded the port. On 24 June Oglethorpe began a 27-day bombardment. On 26 June a sortie by 300 Spanish and free blacks attacked Fort Mose held by 120 Highlander Rangers and 30 Indians. In the Siege of Fort Mose, the garrison was taken by surprise with 68 killed and 34 captured while the Spanish loss was 10 killed.

The Spanish managed to send supply ships through the Royal Navy blockade and any hope of starving St. Augustine into capitulation was lost. Oglethorpe now planned to storm the fortress by land while the navy ships attacked the Spanish ships and half-galleys in the harbor. Commodore Pearce, however resolved to forgo the attack during hurricane season. Oglethorpe gave up the siege and returned to Georgia; abandoning his artillery during his withdrawal.

See also

Battle of Bloody Marsh
Battle of Gully Hole Creek
Battle of Cartagena de Indias
Invasion of Georgia (1742)
Robert Jenkins (master mariner)
The Oglethorpe Plan

References

Battles of the War of Jenkins' Ear
Conflicts in 1740
St. Augustine
St. Augustine
Spanish Florida
Battles in Florida
Austrian Succession
History of the Royal Navy
1740 in North America